Polynoncus patagonicus is a species of hide beetle in the subfamily Omorginae found in Argentina.

References

patagonicus
Beetles described in 1846
Beetles of South America